The 1996 Speedway Grand Prix Qualification or GP Challenge was a series of motorcycle speedway meetings used to determine the 8 riders that qualified for the 1996 Speedway Grand Prix to join the other 8 riders that finished in the leading positions from the 1995 Speedway Grand Prix and Jason Crump who was seeded through to the Grand Prix.

Leigh Adams won the GP Challenge.

Format
 First Round - 4 riders each from Sweden, Denmark, Finland and Norway to Scandinavian Final
 First Round - 32 riders from Continental quarter finals to Continental semi-finals
 First Round - 6 riders from British final to Overseas Final
 First Round - 5 riders from Australian final to Overseas Final
 First Round - 4 riders from United States final to Overseas Final
 First Round - 1 rider from New Zealand final to Overseas Final
 Second Round - 8 riders from Scandinavian final to Intercontinental Final
 Second Round - 8 riders from Overseas final to Intercontinental Final
 Second Round - 16 riders from Continental semi-finals to Continental Final
 Third Round - 8 riders from positions 9-16 from the 1995 Grand Prix to GP Challenge
 Third Round - 4 riders from the Continental Final to GP Challenge
 Third Round - 3 riders from the Intercontinental Final to GP Challenge
 Final Round - 8 riders from the GP Challenge to the 1996 Grand Prix

First round

Continental quarter finals

Second round

Overseas Final
 8 riders to Intercontinental Final

Scandinavian Final
8 riders to Intercontinental Final

Continental semi finals

Third round
Peter Karlsson seeded to GP Challenge
8 riders from positions 9-16 from the 1995 Speedway Grand Prix to GP Challenge final

Intercontinental Final
 3 riders to GP Challenge final

Continental Final 
4 riders to GP Challenge
30 July 1995  Miskolc

Final Round

GP Challenge Final
8 riders to 1996 Grand Prix
8 October 1995  Lonigo

References 

Speedway Grand Prix Qualification
Speedway Grand Prix Qualifications
Qualification